Hans-Walter Peters (born 3 April 1955) is a German banker. He is the current spokesman of the personally liable partners (i.e. head) of Berenberg Bank and the president of the Association of German Banks, the main lobby group for Germany's financial sector.

Career
Peters earned a doctorate in economics at the University of Kiel in 1986, and started his career as a bond portfolio analyst with Dresdner Bank in 1987. He was head of portfolio strategy at DZ Bank 1989–1990 and head of the securities division at Frankfurter Volksbank 1990–1994.

Peters joined Berenberg Bank in 1994, and was named as a personally liable partner at the bank in 2000. As head of Berenberg Bank, he has significantly expanded the bank's activities in London. In 2010, Peters and his co-chairman Hendrik Riehmer borrowed €72 million to buy a 21 per cent stake in Berenberg previously held by public lender NordLB.

Other activities
 KfW, Member of the Board of Supervisory Directors (since 2018)
 Übersee Club, Member of the Board of Trustees
 WHU – Otto Beisheim School of Management, Member of the Board of Trustees

References

German bankers
Berenberg Bank people
1950s births
Living people